Neogene curitiba is a moth of the family Sphingidae first described by E. Dukinfield Jones in 1908. It is known from Brazil.

The wingspan is 52–63 mm. Adults have been recorded in October.

References

Neogene (moth)
Moths described in 1908